Obsession, released in the USA as The Hidden Room, is a 1949 British crime film directed by Edward Dmytryk, based on the 1947 book A Man About a Dog by Alec Coppel, who also wrote the screenplay for the film. Obsession was entered into the 1949 Cannes Film Festival.

Plot
Clive Riordan, a wealthy London psychiatrist, learns that his wife Storm is cheating on him with an American, Bill Kronin. He resolves to get his revenge on both by committing the perfect murder of Kronin.

Kidnapping Kronin at gunpoint, Riordan keeps him prisoner for months in a hidden room while authorities mount a search for the missing man. Riordan reveals to Kronin that he plans to kill him and dissolve his corpse in an acid bath to ensure no evidence remains to be found. Riordan's plot appears to be succeeding until a superintendent from Scotland Yard, Finsbury, visits the doctor's office enquiring about the case and hinting that he knows what Riordan is up to, having been tipped off by an anonymous letter (from Storm, it seems) to the Yard. A three-way battle of wits ensues, with Finsbury trying to solve the case by fundamental police work and psychological tactics (claiming that a "professional," such as himself, has the advantage over the cleverest murderer, who is nearly always an "amateur" and will make mistakes), and Kronin desperately seeking ways to save himself. In the end, a stray cat and Storm's dog, Monty, both play key roles in bringing Riordan's diabolical scheme to its conclusion.

Cast
 Robert Newton as Dr. Clive Riordan
 Phil Brown as Bill Kronin
 Sally Gray as Storm Riordan
 Naunton Wayne as Supt. Finsbury
 James Harcourt as Aitkin (butler)
 Ronald Adam as Clubman
 Allan Jeayes as Clubman
 Olga Lindo as Mrs. Humphries
 Russell Waters as Flying Squad detective
 Sam Kydd as Club steward

Play and novel
Alec Coppel originally wrote the story as a play when living in Sydney during World War II. He adapted the work into a novel while travelling to London. Both play and novel were called A Man About a Dog (although in the USA the novel would be known as Over the Line).

The play opened in London in April 1946.

The novel was published in 1948. Many critics commented that it felt similar to a play.

There was a production of the play in London in May 1949.

Production
Film rights were bought by British producer Noel Madison. He also bought the rights to two other thrillers, Four Hours to Kill by Norman Krasna and The Last Mile by John Wexley.

The director was Edward Dmytryk, who had just left Hollywood following his appearance in front of the House Un-American Activities Committee. He went to England in mid 1948, where he was granted a work permit under the Ministry of Labour – he was permitted the work there under the foreign directors' quota agreement between producers and the local unions. He signed a contract to direct the film with Nat Bronstein of Independent Sovereign Films on 1 October 1948.

Filming took place near the house of Alec Coppel, who wrote the script, near Grosvenor House. Coppel's home was turned into a temporary dressing room.

The plot involved disposing a body by dissolving it in acid. This had similarities to the John George Haigh case. Accordingly, the British Board of Film Censors refused to grant the film a certificate for a time and its release was held up.

Reception
Variety wrote that the film is slow-paced at first but becomes suspenseful.  The New York Times called it "a first-rate study in suspense and abnormal psychology".  Kendal Patterson of the Los Angeles Times described it as an early predecessor of Fatal Attraction.

References

External links
 
 
 
 Review at Variety
 Review of May 1949 production of A Man About a Dog at Variety

1949 films
1949 crime films
British crime films
British black-and-white films
Film noir
Films scored by Nino Rota
Films based on Australian novels
Films based on British novels
Films directed by Edward Dmytryk
Films shot at Pinewood Studios
Films set in London
Films shot in London
1940s English-language films
1940s British films